Paintbox was a graphics utility released for the ZX Spectrum 48K in 1983. Published by Print'n'Plotter Products Ltd in the UK and latter re-released by Erbe Software S.A. in Spain. The program was written by Joe Gillespie.

In 1985 a second version was released under the name of Paint Plus, featuring a User-defined graphics editor, precision plotter, screen planner and an organizer.

See also
 OCP Art Studio

References

External links
 

ZX Spectrum software
Raster graphics editors
1983 software
Proprietary software